Paysandu Sport Club, commonly referred to as Paysandu, is a Brazilian professional club based in Belém, Pará founded on 2 February 1914. It competes in the Campeonato Brasileiro Série C, the third tier of Brazilian football, as well as in the Campeonato Paraense, the top flight of the Pará state football league.

History
On February 2, 1914, members of Norte Club protested against a decision of the football federation of Pará benefiting Remo by terminating the team and refounding other team. Unanimously, the assembly chose Hugo Leão to chair the meeting. As leader of the movement, he proposed the name of Paysandu Foot-Ball Club for the new club. The name was chosen as a tribute to the unfortunate event in Paysandú, a Uruguayan city, which would take the start of the war against Paraguay.

That year, the Norte Club held a good campaign and needed to beat Guarany to force an extra match against Grupo do Remo. After the tie at 1–1, the members of the Norte Club, unreconstructed, asked the Pará's Foot-Ball League the cancellation of the match due to various irregularities. However, the board of the Pará's Foot-Ball League dismissed the appeal.

The decision did not like it one bit to the members of the Norte Club, which then decided to create a movement, under the leadership of Hugo Leão, to the foundation of a new association, stronger, to be able to meet on equal terms their opponents. This movement did not like the members of Grupo do Remo, who tried to persuade Hugo Leão to abandon the idea.

In February 1914, the newspaper O Estado do Pará made the call for the meeting of a new club. The call by the newspaper had an effect, causing those who attended the meeting 42 athletes, many of whom had built the Norte Club, in addition to other different associations. Chosen the name, the assembly elected the first president, Deodoro de Mendonça, who headed the board during the year 1914. It was also chosen the committee to draft the Statutes of the Club, relapsing choosing the names of Mendonça Deodoro, Eurico Amanajás and Arnaldo Morais. To write the status of the club assembly chose the following commission: Deodoro de Mendonça, Eurico Amanajás and Arnaldo Moraes. The second meeting was held on the scheduled date, February 10, 1914 at the same location of the first and with the presence of large number of participants. He was sworn in the elected board, increasing the number of members to 100 and were considered founding partners, more than 15 new members who joined the Paysandu. At the third meeting, on 19 February 1914, the Paysandu, of "Foot-Ball" went to "Sport Club". To be read to the assembly, an office requesting membership of Paysandu the Pará's Football League, the idea of change, which, after heated debates, put to a vote, was approved by a majority vote. And so came the Paysandu Sport Club.

In 1991 and 2001, Paysandu was the champion of the Campeonato Brasileiro Série B. In 2002 the club was champion of Copa Norte, and, later, champion of Copa dos Campeões.

In 2003, Paysandu was eliminated by Boca Juniors on the second leg of a match for Copa Libertadores, after winning the first leg in La Bombonera. That was the club's first participation in the competition.

The club also has two titles of the Copa Verde, as well as being the largest state winners with a record 49 titles.

Symbols

Crest
The crest is blue and white, with the PSC initials, in reference to the name Paysandu Sport Club. At the bottom, there is a winged foot (with wings), creating Mário Bayma who explained its meaning: "The team speed goal would never be equaled or surpassed by his opponents, because come the flight limits." Above the shield is three stars, two silver symbolizing the title of Campeonato Brasileiro Série B of 1991 (left) and 2001 (right), and a gold (central) symbolizing the title of Copa dos Campeões in 2002.

Anthem
The official anthem of Paysandu was composed in 1916 by the poet José Simões, while the music was made by Professor Manuel Luís de Paiva. There is also the "popular" hymn, composed by Francisco Pires Cavalcanti, excited about the victory of Paysandu against Peñarol in 1965, which is better known than the official team anthem.

Traditional home kit 

The uniform was proposed by Hugo Leão, first president of Paysandu, at the meeting held on February 10, 1914. The proposal was not approved by the General Assembly, by unanimous vote of the members, on February 19, 1914, seventeen days later the foundation of the club. The uniform follows the same model to the present day.

Rivalries

Paysandu's biggest rival is Remo, with whom he plays the Clássico Rei da Amazônia (Amazon King derby) or Re-Pa, the largest in the northern region of Brazil. The first game took place on 14 June 1914, with Remo winning 2–1. On 26 July 1945, the biggest score in the derby took place. Paysandu won 7–0 in a match valid for the Campeonato Paraense of that year. In 2016, the derby was declared intangible cultural heritage of the Pará state, being qualified as a cultural expression of the people of Pará.

A further minor rivalry exists between Paysandu and Tuna Luso. The first match happened on 11 December 1932. It was a friendly that ended tied at 3–3.

Stadium

Paysandu's stadium is Curuzu, which has a maximum capacity of 16,200 people. Mangueirão also held several Paysandu matches.

Players

Current squad

Out on loan

Retired numbers

7 – Number dedicated to the Paysandu's supporters.

National league record 
(C): Champion; (P): Promoted; (R): Relegated.

 20 seasons in Campeonato Brasileiro Série A
 18 seasons in Campeonato Brasileiro Série B
 13 seasons in Campeonato Brasileiro Série C

International record

Honours
 Campeonato Brasileiro Série B
 Winners (2): 1991, 2001

 Copa dos Campeões
 Winners (1): 2002

 Copa Verde
 Winners (3): 2016, 2018, 2022

 Copa Norte
 Winners (1): 2002

 Campeonato Paraense
 Winners (49): 1920, 1921, 1922, 1923, 1927, 1928, 1929, 1931, 1932, 1934, 1939, 1942, 1943, 1944, 1945, 1947, 1956, 1957, 1959, 1961, 1962, 1963, 1965, 1966, 1967, 1969, 1971, 1972, 1976, 1980, 1981, 1982, 1984, 1985, 1987, 1992, 1998, 2000, 2001, 2002, 2005, 2006, 2009, 2010, 2013, 2016, 2017, 2020, 2021

References

External links
Official Site
Paysandu on Globo Esporte

Paysandu Sport Club
Association football clubs established in 1914
Football clubs in Pará
Belém
1914 establishments in Brazil
Campeonato Brasileiro Série B winners
Copa Verde winners
Copa Norte winners